Encolpotis scioplasta is a moth in the family Gelechiidae. It was described by Edward Meyrick in 1920. It is found in Kenya.

References

Endemic moths of Kenya
Gelechiinae
Moths described in 1920
Taxa named by Edward Meyrick